Madison Pogarch (born November 5, 1997) is an American professional soccer player who plays as a defender for San Diego Wave FC of the National Women's Soccer League. She played college soccer at Central Michigan University and Rutgers University.

College career 
Pogarch played three years of collegiate soccer at Central Michigan University of the Mid-American Conference (MAC), where she was a two-time all-MAC performer and First Team All-MAC in 2017. She completed her education at Rutgers University in 2018 where she started all 19 matches. She was voted Big Ten Defensive Player of the Week on October 9, 2018, after playing every minute in two Big Ten overtime wins, both shutouts.

Club career 
While in college, Pogarch played as an amateur with senior semi-pro teams over the summer. She helped Grand Rapids FC to a United Women's Soccer championship in 2017, scoring the only goal of the game in an early win at Fort Wayne. She then played for Detroit Sun in 2018.

Portland Thorns FC 
Pogarch was signed by the Portland Thorns in early May 2019. She made her first appearance for the team on May 25 in a game against Sky Blue FC and had her first start a few weeks later, on June 15 against the North Carolina Courage.

San Diego Wave FC 
On July 25, 2022, the Thorns announced that the club had traded Pogarch to San Diego Wave FC in exchange for defender Tegan McGrady.

International career 
In August 2019, she was named to the US Women's U-23 team to compete in the 2019 Nordic Tournament.

Honors and awards

Club
Portland Thorns FC
 NWSL Community Shield : 2020
 NWSL Challenge Cup: 2021
 International Champions Cup: 2021
 NWSL Shield: 2021

References

External links
 
 
 

1997 births
Living people
Rutgers Scarlet Knights women's soccer players
Central Michigan Chippewas women's soccer players
Soccer players from Michigan
National Women's Soccer League players
Portland Thorns FC players
San Diego Wave FC players
Women's association football defenders
American women's soccer players
People from Livingston County, Michigan
Sportspeople from Metro Detroit